Topping is an English surname. Notable people with the surname include:

 Chris Topping (born 1951), English former footballer
 Dan Topping (1912–1974), former owner of the New York Yankees
 George Topping (1881–1958), former Australian rules footballer
 Harry Topping (1913–2001), English footballer, later a coach in the Netherlands
 Henry Topping (footballer, born 1908) (died 1977), English footballer
 Henry Topping (footballer, born 1915) (died 2004), English footballer
 James Stirratt Topping Kennedy (1930–1973), Scottish security guard killed by armed robbers
 Jenny Topping (born 1980), American softball player
 Keith Topping (born 1963), British screenwriter
 Keith James Topping (born 1947), British researcher
 Keith Topping (American football) (1912–1972), American football player
 Michael Topping (1747–1796), Chief Marine Surveyor of Fort St. George in Chennai, India
 Norman Topping (1908–1997), former president of the University of Southern California and Assistant U.S. Surgeon General
 Patrick Topping, English DJ
 Seymour Topping (1921–2020), American journalist and writer
 Simon Topping, lead singer and founder of late 70s post-punk band ‘a Certain Ratio’. 
 [Simon Topping], English Methodist minister and faith leader
 Walter Topping (died 1980), Northern Irish politician

See also
 Carlos Toppings (1953–2007), Costa Rican professional footballer
 Topping (disambiguation)

English-language surnames